The NORCECA qualification for the 2010 FIVB Women's Volleyball World Championship saw member nations compete for six places at the finals in Japan.

Draw
32 of the 35 NORCECA national teams entered qualification. The teams were distributed according to their position in the FIVB Senior Women's Rankings as of 5 January 2008 using the serpentine system for their distribution. (Rankings shown in brackets) Teams ranked 1–7 did not compete in the first and second rounds, and automatically qualified for the third round.

First round

Second round

Third round

Playoff round

First round

Pool A
Venue:  Omnisports Hall, Marigot, Saint Martin
Dates: April 15–19, 2009
All times are Atlantic Standard Time (UTC−04:00)

|}

|}

Pool B
Venue:  Beausejour Indoor Stadium, Gros Islet, Saint Lucia
Dates: March 27–29, 2009
All times are Atlantic Standard Time (UTC−04:00)

|}

|}

Second round

Pool C
Venue:  UWI Sport & Physical Education Centre, Port of Spain, Trinidad and Tobago
Dates: June 2–6, 2009
All times are Atlantic Standard Time (UTC−04:00)

Preliminary round

Group A

|}

|}

Group B

|}

|}

Final round

Semifinals

|}

5th place

|}

3rd place

|}

Final

|}

Final standing

Pool D
Venue:  Garfield Sobers Gymnasium, Bridgetown, Barbados
Dates: June 10–14, 2009
All times are Atlantic Standard Time (UTC−04:00)

Preliminary round

Group A

|}

|}

Group B

|}

|}

Final round

Semifinals

|}

5th place

|}

3rd place

|}

Final

|}

Final standing

Pool E
Venue:  Gimnasio del Polideportivo España, Managua, Nicaragua
Dates: December 9–13, 2008
All times are Central Standard Time (UTC−06:00)

|}

|}

Third round

Pool F
Venue:  Coliseo de la Ciudad Deportiva, Havana, Cuba
Dates: June 21–23, 2009
All times are Cuba Daylight Time (UTC−04:00)

|}

|}

Pool G
Venue:  UCF Arena, Orlando, United States
Dates: July 6–8, 2009
All times are Eastern Daylight Time (UTC−04:00)

|}

|}

Pool H
Venue:  Gran Arena del Cibao, Santiago de los Caballeros, Dominican Republic
Dates: June 12–14, 2009
All times are Atlantic Standard Time (UTC−04:00)

|}

|}

Pool I
Venue:  Coliseo Héctor Solá Bezares, Caguas, Puerto Rico
Dates: July 7–9, 2009
All times are Atlantic Standard Time (UTC−04:00)

|}

|}

Playoff round

Pool J
Venue:  High Performance Sports Center of Baja California, Tijuana, Mexico
Dates: August 28–30, 2009
All times are Pacific Daylight Time (UTC−07:00)

|}

|}

References

External links
 2010 World Championship Qualification

2010 FIVB Volleyball Women's World Championship
2008 in volleyball
2009 in volleyball
FIVB Volleyball World Championship qualification